Giulio Santuccio, O.F.M. Conv. (1545–1607) was a Roman Catholic prelate who served as Bishop of Sant'Agata de' Goti (1588–1607).

Biography
Giulio Santuccio was born in 1545 and ordained a priest in the Order of Friars Minor Conventual.
On 11 December 1595, he was appointed during the papacy of Pope Clement VI as Bishop of Sant'Agata de' Goti.
He served as Bishop of Sant'Agata de' Goti until his death on 25 December 1607 in Rome.

While bishop, he was the principal co-consecrator of Girolamo Bernardino Pallantieri, Bishop of Bitonto (1603).

References

External links and additional sources
 (for Chronology of Bishops) 
 (for Chronology of Bishops) 

16th-century Italian Roman Catholic bishops
Bishops appointed by Pope Clement VI
1545 births
1607 deaths
Conventual Franciscan bishops